Keith Cameron Meldrum CB, MRCVS, DVSM, HonFRSH (born 1937) was the United Kingdom's Chief Veterinary Officer from June 1988 to April 1997.

Biography
After two years in general practice as a veterinary surgeon, he joined the State Veterinary Service, as a veterinary officer, and worked there during the 1967 foot-and-mouth outbreak. His tenure as CVO coincided with the Bovine spongiform encephalopathy (BSE) epidemic, to which he led the government's response.

A lifetime member of the British Veterinary Association, he sits on the council of their Central Veterinary Society division. He was made a Companion of The Most Honourable Order of the Bath (CB) in the 1995 New Year Honours. He is also an Honorary Member of the Royal Society for Public Health (HonFRSH), a Member of the Royal College of Veterinary Surgeons (MRCVS), and holds a Diploma in Veterinary State Medicine (DVSM).

References

External links 

 

British veterinarians
Place of birth missing (living people)
Companions of the Order of the Bath
Members of the Royal College of Veterinary Surgeons
1937 births
Living people